Two ships of the United States Navy have been named USS North Dakota in honor of the 39th state.

  was a  that was commissioned in 11 April 1910, and participated in World War I.
  is a  that was commissioned in October 2014.

See also
 , an auxiliary Gopher State-class crane ship launched in 1968 currently in ready reserve since 1993.

United States Navy ship names